Marie-Gabrielle Capet (6 September 1761 – 1 November 1818) was a French Neoclassical painter. She was born in Lyon on 6 September 1761. Capet came from a modest background and her previous background and artistic training is unknown, but in 1781 she became the pupil of the French painter Adélaïde Labille-Guiard in Paris. She excelled as a portrait painter and her works include oil paintings, watercolours, and miniatures.

Life

Marie-Gabrielle Capet was born in Lyon in 1761. In her youth, Capet attended a public drawing school located in her town. In eighteenth-century France, the Royal Academy of Art was responsible for training artists and exhibiting artworks at the Salon that glorified heroic values promoted by the Bourbon monarchy. Until the French Revolution, the Royal Academy of Art in Paris was the central institution for official artistic practice, and limited its number of female students to four at a time. In 1781, twenty-year-old Capet moved to Paris to become the student of Adélaïde Labille-Guiard (1749–1803), a Neoclassical artist who was admitted to the Academy in 1783.

Capet showed her early work at the Exposition de la jeunesse in 1781 and 1783, and later exhibited at the Salon when it was opened to all artists after the French Revolution. Her body of work included miniature paintings, oil paintings, and pastels, which were praised for their virtuoso draftsmanship and use of colour. Many of her pastel paintings were portraits, though by 1808 she was regarded as a history painter in her own right. She counted among other customers several members of the royal family, and other members of Paris society, such as the lawyer Pierre-Nicolas Berryer and the playwright Joseph Chénier.

Capet and Labille-Guiard not only enjoyed a professional relationship, but were also close family friends. Capet would move in with her teacher at the Louvre until Labille-Guiard's death. Even after Labille-Guiard married the painter François Vincent in 1799, Capet continued to live in their home. After Labille-Guiard's death, Capet lived with her husband until his death in 1816. Upon his death, Capet purchased Labille-Guiard and Vincent's estate.

Among her works the best known are those of Mesdames Adelaide and Victoire, Madame Vincent surrounded by her pupils, Mlle. Mars, and Jean-Antoine Houdon. At that time, the Academy had limited the members of women painters to only four female members. She died in Paris in 1818.

Works 
The work of Marie-Gabrielle Capet contains a large collection of miniature portraits, the majority of which are housed in The Louvre.  Included in this collection are portraits of Madame Martin de Lesseps, Madame Elisabeth, sister of Louis XVI, and Mademoiselle Mars.

Though little work of Capet is known, there have been some miniatures attributed to her that are speculated to be of Elisabeth-Philippine-Marie-Helene de France, often called Madame Elisabeth. Madame Elisabeth was famously painted by Labille-Guiard as well. The unsigned miniature that is presumed to be of Madame Elisabeth is located at Musée du Louvre. The miniature depicts a woman in a white, muslin dress and a dark sash. Other miniatures signed by Capet have unknown whereabouts.

See also
 Académie royale de peinture et de sculpture

References

Attribution:

External links
Marie-Gabrielle Capet 

1761 births
1818 deaths
Burials at Père Lachaise Cemetery
French women painters
Artists from Lyon
18th-century French painters
Pupils of Adélaïde Labille-Guiard
19th-century French painters